Elvis' Golden Records is a compilation album by  American rock and roll singer Elvis Presley, issued by RCA Victor in March 1958. It compiled his hit singles released in 1956 and 1957, and is widely believed to be the first greatest hits album in rock and roll history. It is the first of five RCA Victor Elvis' Golden/Gold Records compilations, the first four of which were issued during Presley's lifetime. The album peaked at number three on the Billboard Top Pop Albums chart and was certified 6× platinum on August 17, 1999, by the Recording Industry Association of America.

Songs
Elvis' Golden Records collects nine number one A-sides along with four B-sides, "Loving You", "That's When Your Heartaches Begin", "Treat Me Nice" and "Anyway You Want Me", and one album track, "Love Me", originally issued on the 1956 LP Elvis. Every flip-side also hit the chart separately from its parent hit side, with four making the Top 40; chart positions noted for those tracks individually. "Love Me" was also included on the Elvis Vol. 1 EP single which made the top ten on the singles chart.

In the 1950s, a gold record awarded for a single referred to sales of one million units, different from the definition in use by the late 1970s for albums, where a gold record came to mean album sales of 500,000 units. Exact figures from the RIAA are difficult to confirm, but in the press conference from September 22, 1958, originally released on the RCA Victor EP Elvis Sails in 1958 and included on disc four of the RCA CD boxed set The King of Rock 'n' Roll: The Complete 50s Masters, the interviewer asked Presley for a tally of his gold records. Presley responded, "I have 25 million sellers, and two albums that have sold a million each."

Most of the songs in the compilation were recorded at Radio Recorders in Hollywood, with other sessions at the RCA Victor studios in New York City, at 20th Century-Fox's Stage One in Hollywood, and the RCA Victor studios in Nashville, Tennessee. Although RCA Victor executive Steve Sholes was the in-house A&R man for Presley, and nominally in charge of his recording sessions at RCA Victor, accounts by Presley historian Peter Guralnick and Presley discographer Ernst Mikael Jorgensen indicate that Presley himself acted as the producer for his RCA Victor sessions in the 1950s.

The unified Billboard Hot 100 singles chart was not created until August 1958, after the release of this compilation, and of course after the release of all of these singles. Chart positions referenced were taken from the "Best Sellers in Stores" chart, although early statistics for rock and roll records also came from the "Most Played in Jukeboxes" chart.

Critical reception

In a review for AllMusic, Bruce Eder commented:

Reissues
Elvis' Golden Records is one of Presley's most popular albums and has remained consistently available since its original 1958 issue. RCA first reissued the original 14 track album on compact disc in 1984. This release, in reprocessed (simulated) stereo sound, was quickly withdrawn and the album was reissued in original monophonic. RCA reissued the album on CD again in 1997 and added six bonus tracks, with "Blue Suede Shoes" an unusual track in that it was issued simultaneously in conjunction with every track from Elvis' debut LP Elvis Presley in singles form, more than five months after the release of the album on March 23. Two more charting B-sides, "I Was the One" and "My Baby Left Me", and three Sun Records tracks rounded out the compact disc. RCA Victor had purchased the rights to reissue Sun material when buying Elvis' contract from Sam Phillips in 1955, using Sun recordings to fill out album tracks throughout the decade.

Vinyl rerelease
In the 2020s, the vinyl version of the album rereleased. But instead of black, the record is gold-colored.

Track listing
Details are taken from the 1958 and 1997 RCA Records albums liner notes and may differ from other sources. See singles discography and song list for additional information.

Original LP

1997 CD reissue

Original UK LP

Chart performance

Certifications

References

External links
 
LPM-1707 Elvis Presley Guide part of The Elvis Presley Record Research Database

Albums produced by Steve Sholes
Elvis Presley compilation albums
1958 greatest hits albums
RCA Victor compilation albums